Raghda Khateb (born January 2, 1978) is a Syrian actress and voice actress.

Filmography

Cartoon 
Adventures from the Book of Virtues
Ben 10 - Charmcaster
Charley and Mimmo - Amjad (T'choupi) (Venus Centre version)
Futurama - Amy Wong
Krypto the Superdog - Kevin Whitney, Brainy Barker, Isis
Little Clowns of Happytown
¡Mucha Lucha! - Buena Girl (Venus Centre version) 
Stickin' Around - Stacy Stickler
The Wacky World of Tex Avery - Maurice

References

External links
Raghda Khateb at ElCinema

1978 births
21st-century Syrian actresses
Syrian voice actresses
People from as-Suwayda
Living people
Syrian voice directors